Symphony in D can refer to:

List of symphonies in D minor
List of symphonies in D major

See also
List of symphonies by key